A Christmas cracker is an entertainment item used in some Christmas celebrations.

Christmas Cracker may also refer to:
 Christmas Cracker (film), a 1963 Canadian short film
 "Christmas Crackers" (Are You Being Served episode), 1975 Christmas special of the British TV sitcom
 "Christmas Crackers" (Only Fools and Horses), 1981 Christmas special of the British TV sitcom